Tylersport is an unincorporated community in Salford Township in Montgomery County, Pennsylvania, United States. Tylersport is located at the intersection of Pennsylvania Route 563 and Allentown Road.

References

Unincorporated communities in Montgomery County, Pennsylvania
Unincorporated communities in Pennsylvania